John Will (born ) is a notable martial artist from Australia. Will won the Best Exponent Award in the first World Silat Championships held in Jakarta in 1981. Will also completed his black belt in Brazilian Jiu Jitsu under Rigan Machado and Jean Jacques Machado in 1998, making him one of the first twelve foreign nationals to have earned a black belt in Brazilian Jiu Jitsu.

Martial artist
Will's background includes training in amateur wrestling, Goju Kai Karate and Taekwondo, training with Benny Urquidez, Gene LeBell, Pete Cunningham, Rorion Gracie and Rickson Gracie and the Machado brothers and teaching Shootfighting. During a trip to India, Will trained in the art of Vajra Mushti under the Jyesthimalla clan in Gujarat, India. Will is also credited with publishing a rare first-hand account of the ancient Indian martial art in western media.

Will is noted for taking several overseas martial arts training trips each year, and has been doing so since 1975; including training in Indonesia, Thailand, Hong Kong, Japan, the U.S. and Brazil. After receiving his Brazilian Jiu Jitsu black belt from Professor Rigan Machado in 1998, he became national director of Machado Brazilian Jiu Jitsu in Australia. The organisation is the largest in the Australasian region (with over 70 member schools) and is known as BJJ Australasia. He teaches BJJ, as well as  Shootfighting, at his REDCAT Academy in Geelong. Will's regular schedule includes a wide-ranging seminar circuit spanning several countries as well as most of the Australian states.

Along with partner David Meyer (based in San Francisco), Will founded and authored a BJJ Curriculum (BJJ America) - providing more than 600 schools throughout the USA with a means to facilitate their entry into the art of Brazilian Jiu Jitsu. More recently, he has tailor-designed various curriculi for several notable martial arts organisations including Chuck Norris's UFAF (United Fighting Arts Federation).

Will teaches defensive tactics programs to various law enforcement and military agencies; including the Australian Federal Police, the Australian Defence Forces, the Marine Corps at Quantico in Virginia, USA  and many others.

Writing
Will is a self-published author, with four instructional books directed at the Brazilian Jiu Jitsu and Self-defence market. His first three books are purely BJJ orientated and cover: Fundamentals, The Guard and Advanced Attacks & Escapes. His fourth Instructional Book is "Fight ~ Logic" a book that covers Will's passion for all aspects of the self-defence game, from Pre-Fight scenarios right through to taking the fight to the ground and conclusion.

Will's recent writing focus has been the penning of his autobiography, which has been released as a 3 part series entitled Rogue Black Belt. The series focusses on a chronological set of life-lessons. As with his instructional books, Will has published these works himself .

 Book 1: Rogue Black Belt: Fear & the Engine focuses on Will's early years growing up in Australia and the path that led him to the Martial Arts and onto Bali and his Silat World Championship win in 1982.
 Book 2: Rogue Black Belt: Challenge & Ownership continues the story after the Bali years and through the forming of Blitz Magazine in Australia and his subsequent travels to India, Thailand, Japan, the USA and Brazil, where he interacts with some of Martial Arts' biggest legends and most famous practitioners, leading to his discovery of Brazilian Jiu Jitsu.
 Book 3: Rogue Black Belt: Passion & Purpose will take Will's story from his fledgling BJJ and Defensive Tactics teachings to the full blown instructor of instructors of today.

Personal life
Will resides in Geelong, a large regional town in the southern Australian state of Victoria. He is married to Melissa Will.

Instructor lineage 
Kanō Jigorō → Tomita Tsunejirō → Mitsuyo "Count Koma" Maeda → Hélio Gracie → Rolls Gracie & Carlos "Carlinhos" Gracie Jr → Rigan Machado → John Will

Notable students
 Elvis Sinosic - UFC Fighter
 Anthony Perosh - UFC Fighter
 George Sotiropoulos - UFC Fighter

References

External links
John Will's autobiography Rogue Black Belt: His life from his perspective
John Will profile
Will/Machado BJJ Australia

Australian practitioners of Brazilian jiu-jitsu
Sportspeople from Geelong
Living people
1957 births
Brazilian jiu-jitsu trainers